State Route 149 (SR 149) is a  state highway that travels south-to-north through rural portions of Telfair and Wheeler counties in the central part of the U.S. state of Georgia.

Route description
The route begins at an intersection with SR 117 southwest of Lumber City. It zigzags its way north to an intersection with SR 149 Connector, southeast of McRae. It heads northeast to an intersection with US 27/US 341/SR 27. SR 149 continues to the northeast until it meets its northern terminus, an intersection with US 280/SR 30 southwest of Alamo.

SR 149 is not part of the National Highway System, a system of roadways important to the nation's economy, defense, and mobility.

Major intersections

Related route

State Route 149 Connector (SR 149 Conn.) exists entirely within the northern part of Telfair County.

It begins at an intersection with the SR 149 mainline, southeast of Mcrae. The highway heads nearly due northwest until it meets its northern terminus, an intersection with US 319/US 441/SR 31 south of McRae.

SR 149 Connector is not part of the National Highway System, a system of roadways important to the nation's economy, defense, and mobility.

See also

References

External links

 
 Georgia Roads (Routes 141 - 160)

149
Transportation in Telfair County, Georgia
Transportation in Wheeler County, Georgia